Levent Osman (born 8 March 1977, in Melbourne) is an Australian former association football player of Turkish Cypriot descent. He played as a defender.

He has previously played for Trabzonspor in Turkey, FCU Politehnica Timişoara in Romania, Tampere United in Finland as well as South Melbourne, Auckland Kingz in (New Zealand) and Gippsland Falcons in the Australian NSL.

He has represented Australia at under-20 level and in the Olympic team between 1997 and 1999.

He was awarded Youth Player of the Year 1997. He was also the winner of the Jimmy Rooney Medal(Man of the Match) in the 2004 Premier League Grand Final.

References

Levent Osman at Ozfootball.net.

1977 births
Living people
Australian people of Turkish Cypriot descent
Sportspeople of Turkish Cypriot descent
Soccer players from Melbourne
Association football defenders
National Soccer League (Australia) players
Veikkausliiga players
Liga I players
Süper Lig players
Expatriate footballers in Finland
Expatriate footballers in Romania
Australian expatriate sportspeople in Romania
FC Politehnica Timișoara players
Football Kingz F.C. players
Gippsland Falcons players
South Melbourne FC players
Tampere United players
Trabzonspor footballers
Dandenong Thunder SC players
Australian soccer players